Charles Labouchere (10 April 1880 – 12 October 1966) was a Dutch equestrian. He competed in two events at the 1928 Summer Olympics.

References

External links
 
 

1880 births
1966 deaths
Dutch male equestrians
Olympic equestrians of the Netherlands
Equestrians at the 1928 Summer Olympics
People from Doorn
Sportspeople from Utrecht (province)